Sir Edward Spencer (1594 – 16 February 1656) was an English landowner, lawyer, knight, nobleman, and politician who sat in the House of Commons at various times between 1621 and 1648.

Life
Spencer was the son of Robert Spencer, 1st Baron Spencer of Wormleighton and his wife  Margaret Willoughby the daughter of Sir Francis Willoughby and Elizabeth Lyttelton. He was baptised at Brington on 2 March 1594. He matriculated at Corpus Christi College, Oxford on 13 November 1609, aged 14 and was awarded  BA on 18 February 1612. In 1618 he was called to the bar at Lincoln's Inn.

 
In 1621, Spencer was elected Member of Parliament for Brackley. He was re-elected MP for Brackley in 1624 and 1625. He was of Boston Manor when he was knighted at Hampton Court on 27 December 1625. In 1626 he was elected MP for Middlesex. He was re-elected MP for Middlesex in May 1648 as a recruiter to the Long Parliament, but was excluded under Pride's Purge in December.

Spencer died  at the age of 61 and was buried at Great Brington, Northamptonshire.

Family
Spencer married Lady Margaret Reade, widow of Sir William Reade of Osterley and daughter of John Goldsmith of Welby Suffolk. She was the builder of the Jacobean Boston Manor in 1622. They had no children.

References

External links
Art & Architecture Monument to Sir Edward Spencer

1594 births
1656 deaths
Landowners from the Kingdom of England
English MPs 1621–1622
English MPs 1624–1625
English MPs 1625
English MPs 1626
English MPs 1640–1648
Younger sons of barons